Perittia smaragdophanes is a moth in the family Elachistidae. It was described by Edward Meyrick in 1932. It is found in Ecuador.

References

Moths described in 1932
Elachistidae
Moths of South America